The Naval Special Operations Command (NAVSOCOM) is a separate command of the Philippine Navy trained in special operations, sabotage, psychological and unconventional warfare and is heavily influenced by the United States Navy SEALs. NAVSOCOM is headquartered at Sangley Point, Cavite City. It has eleven units located across the Philippines, from Naval Operating Base San Vicente at Santa Ana, Cagayan in the north to Naval Station Zamboanga in the south.

The unit's tasks were also expanded to cover all facets of unconventional warfare in a maritime and riverine environment. This includes but is not limited to demolition, hostage rescue, harassment, force protection and maritime tactical operations.

History 
The predecessor unit to the NAVSOCOM, the Underwater Operations Team or UOT was activated on 5 November 1956 as a special operations unit of the Philippine Navy. Patterned after the US Navy Underwater Demolition Teams and the Italian Decima Flottiglia MAS with modifications for Philippine conditions, from its founding the UOT was charged with conducting underwater operations in waterways, beach areas and harbors in support of Philippine naval operations. These operations included underwater explosive disposal, mine countermeasures, salvage and search and rescue. In 1959, the UOT was expanded and redesignated the Underwater Operations Unit (UOU), then as the Underwater Operations Group (UOG).

The UOG was then renamed Special Warfare Group (SWG) in 1983, then Naval Special Warfare Group (NSWG), and later on as the Naval Special Operations Group (NAVSOG) on May 30, 2005.  The unit took the Naval Special Operations Command (NAVSOCOM) name.

Role 
The unit specializes in SEa, Air, Land (SEAL) operations ranging from reconnaissance, close combat, demolition, intelligence and underwater operations in support of overall naval operations. The unit gained prominence in a number of counter-terrorism operations, most notably against the Abu Sayyaf Group, and is known for its highly-demanding physical training program which is based on the United States Navy SEAL program.

Training 
The NAVSOCOM training program is known as Basic Naval Special Operations Course (BNSOC).  The program is physically and mentally demanding and is regarded as one of the toughest military selection programs around the world.  Candidates have to swim 3 kilometers and run 10 kilometers every day.  Furthermore, they must swim 14.6 nautical miles from Roxas Boulevard in Manila to Sangley Point, Cavite City without any rest.  They also undergo "Hell Week", considered as the most demanding week of BNSOC training. Candidates have to carry out demanding physical team events with their boat crews without any sleep at all for an entire week. In one BNSOC class, only 21 students remained from 79 applicants who originally started the BNSOC training program. These are only the common and basic training phases of BNSOC, with further evolutions of the training (including interrogation resistance) remaining highly classified.

Under Filipino law, women can apply to become SEALs, but thus far none have. Prospective SEALS are put through BUD/S, which lasts for four months and can often stretch into six with breaks between phases.

United States influence 
There are similarities between the Philippines Naval Special Operations Command and the U.S. Naval Special Warfare Command. NAVSOCOM operators are trained and operate in a manner similar to the U.S. Navy SEALs. They also wear a trident similar to their U.S. Navy counterparts.

The Filipino counterpart of the U.S. counterterrorist United States Naval Special Warfare Development Group (DEVGRU) is the Philippine Naval Special Reaction Group (SRG), which operates under the direction of Naval Intelligence.

They  frequently train with their American counterparts and operate alongside the Philippine Marines and the Philippine Army's Special Operations Command (SOCOM).

Units
NAVSOCOM is composed of the following units as of 2020:

Type Groups
 Headquarters, NAVSOCOM
 SEAL Group (SEALG)
 Special Boat Group (SBG)
 Naval Diving Group (NDG)
 Naval Explosive Ordnance Disposal Group (NEODG)
 Combat Service Support Group (CSSG)
 NAVSPECOPNS Training and Doctrine Center (NSOTDC)

Naval Special Operations Units (NAVSOUs)
Each unit is made up of 3 to 6 special operations and support teams, each of which have 8 sailors (1 officer, 7 enlisted). 
 Naval Special Operations Unit 1
 Naval Special Operations Unit 2
 Naval Special Operations Unit 3
 Naval Special Operations Unit 4
 Naval Special Operations Unit 5
 Naval Special Operations Unit 6
 Naval Special Operations Unit 7
 Naval Special Operations Unit 8
 Naval Special Operations Unit 9
 Naval Special Operations Unit 10
 Naval Special Operations Unit 11

References

Bibliography

External links

 Official Website of the NAVSOG
  Basic Naval Special Operations Course (BNSOC) News Report

Naval special forces units and formations
Special forces of the Philippines
Commands of the Philippine Navy
Military units and formations established in the 2000s
1956 establishments in the Philippines